Northern Croatia or North Croatia refers to the northern parts of Croatia, encompassing Zagreb, Varaždin, Međimurje, Zagorje and Koprivnica-Križevci counties, including the cities of Zagreb, Varaždin, Čakovec, Krapina, Koprivnica and Križevci. The region is home to the Kajkavian dialect. The region borders Hungary to its north-east and Slovenia to its north-west.

Status
The term had not been used in official capacity until recently. Until 2012, the region's borders coincided with the NUTS-2 region Northwest Croatia (Sjeverozapadna Hrvatska in Croatian). This NUTS-2 region was then merged with Central and Eastern Croatia (Središnja i Istočna Hrvatska) forming the NUTS-2 region Continental Croatia. As of 2021, the NUTS-2 region of "Northern Croatia" was established again, which contains all of Northern Croatia with the exception of Zagreb, which forms a separate NUTS region.

Cuisine

The cuisine of Northern Croatia includes dishes of a few local or regional cuisines (Zagorje, Međimurje, Podravina) which have their specific cooking traditions, characteristic for the area and not necessarily well known in other parts of Croatia, as well as dishes that can be found all across the country. The Međimurska gibanica is one of the layer cakes popular in Northern Croatia, especially in the Međimurje region.

Industry

Modern infrastructure
The Northern Croatia region is at the borders with Hungary and Slovenia. The North-South highway corridor provides access to the Adriatic, which is a geographic advantage to the other countries in Southern Europe. All of North Croatia is connected to the rest of Croatia by highways. 95% of the houses in the region have sufficient ADSL internet access, and some businesses have used fibre optics to do their business. The region has a very well maintained gas network.

Technology
The innovative sector of Northern Croatia has experienced growth in the past years. In 2005, Microsoft established a worker training center in Varaždin. Following this, many other companies have established universities in the fields of Information technology, Automation, and Electronics. The continued investment in universities in the region will meet the demands of the consumers that live there and will continue growth in the region. The availability of first-class human resources in a university in Varaždin has led to advances in software and game development.

Education

Public universities
Two national public universities are operating in the region.
University North
University of Zagreb

References

External links

 Krapina-Zagorje County - a part of Northern Croatia
 Koprivnica-Križevci County - a part of Northern Croatia 
 Northern and Central Croatia cover a third of the country and are the most densely populated areas, inhabited by about half (2,16 million) of the whole population of Croatia
 Tourist attractions of Northern Croatia
 Invitation to Northern Croatia

Regions of Croatia